The Mysterious Princess (Italian:Principessa Misteriosa) is a 1920 American-Italian silent film directed by Herbert Brenon and starring Marie Doro.

Cast

References

Bibliography
 Phillips, Alastair & Vincendeau, Ginette. Journeys of Desire: European Actors in Hollywood. British Film Institute, 2006.

External links

1920 films
1920s Italian-language films
Films directed by Herbert Brenon
Italian silent feature films
American silent feature films
American black-and-white films
Italian-language American films
1920s American films